Mount Whymper, 2,844 m, is a mountain located in the Canadian Rockies, British Columbia, Canada, in the Vermilion Pass area in Kootenay National Park.

The mountain is named for its first conqueror, the English alpinist, explorer, writer and engraver Edward Whymper.

In 1901, Whymper and his four guides (Joseph Bossoney, Christian Kaufmann, Christian Klucker, and Joseph Pollinger) first climbed Mount Whymper.  Whymper was exploring the area sponsored by Canadian Pacific Railway (CPR) to promote the Canadian Rocky Mountains and the railway in his conferences. 

There is another Mount Whymper, (1539 m – ) in British Columbia, on Vancouver Island, named for Edward's brother Frederick Whymper.


Geology

Mount Whymper is composed of sedimentary rock laid down during the Precambrian to Jurassic periods. Formed in shallow seas, this sedimentary rock was pushed east and over the top of younger rock during the Laramide orogeny.

Climate

Based on the Köppen climate classification, Mount Whymper is located in a subarctic climate zone with cold, snowy winters, and mild summers. Winter temperatures can drop below −20 °C with wind chill factors below −30 °C.

References

Further reading
 Gerry Shea, Mountain Treks in British Columbia, PP 188 - 189

External links
 Mount Whymper weather: Mountain Forecast
 Mt. Whymper southeast aspect: Flickr

Two-thousanders of British Columbia
Canadian Rockies
East Kootenay
Kootenay Land District